Aerial Africa is a television series made for the Smithsonian Channel. Each episode is an aerial video tour of a country or region in Africa, in a similar format to Aerial America (2010–19). The narrated show consists entirely of aerial scenes using the Cineflex V14HD gyro-stabilized camera system mounted under the "chin" of a helicopter. It was narrated by Nigerian-American Ike Amadi. The first season covered only Southern Africa, and as of 2020 there is no announcement of a second season.

Episodes

References

External links 
 Aerial Africa at the Smithsonian Channel
 

2017 South African television series debuts
2018 South African television series endings
South African documentary television series
English-language television shows
Smithsonian Channel original programming